Littleover is an electoral ward in the city of Derby, England.  The ward contains eleven listed buildings that are recorded in the National Heritage List for England.  All the listed buildings are designated at Grade II, the lowest of the three grades, which is applied to "buildings of national importance and special interest". The ward contains the former village of Littleover, which is now a suburb to the southwest of the centre of Derby. The listed buildings consist of houses and cottages, a church, a country house converted into a school, a horse trough, and a war memorial.
  

Buildings

References

Citations

Sources

 

Lists of listed buildings in Derbyshire
Listed buildings in Derby